Alexander Salmon may refer to:

Alex Salmon (born 1994), English footballer
Alexander Salmon (1820–1866), English-Tahitian merchant

See also
Alexander Salmond (disambiguation)